Stanley or Stan Baker may refer to:

R. Stan Baker (born 1977), American judge
Stan Baker, on Southern Cloud
Stan Baker (True Blood), fictional character
Stanley Baker (1928–1976), Welsh actor and producer

See also